Joseph Williams Blakesley (6 March 1808 – 18 April 1885) was an English clergyman.

Life
Blakesley was born in London and was educated at St Paul's School, London, and at Corpus Christi and Trinity College, Cambridge.  At university he became a member of the "Apostles Club", along with Alfred Tennyson and other literary names.  In 1831 he was elected a fellow, and in 1839 a tutor of Trinity. In 1833 he took holy orders and from 1845 to 1872 held the college living of Ware, Hertfordshire. Over the signature "Hertfordshire Incumbent" he contributed a large number of letters to The Times on the leading social and political subjects of the day, and he also wrote many reviews of books for that paper.

In 1863 he was made a canon of Canterbury Cathedral and in 1872 Dean of Lincoln. Blakesley was the author of the first English Life of Aristotle (1839), an edition of Herodotus (1852–1854) in the Bibliotheca Classica, and Four Months in Algeria (1859).

References

Attribution

External links

1808 births
1885 deaths
People educated at St Paul's School, London
Alumni of Corpus Christi College, Cambridge
Alumni of Trinity College, Cambridge
Canons of Canterbury
Deans of Lincoln
English classical scholars
English male writers